Letlow is a surname. Notable people with the surname include: 

 Julia Letlow (born 1981), American politician and academic administrator
 Luke Letlow (1979–2020), American politician
 Russ Letlow (1913–1987), American football player

English-language surnames